Spirovo is an urban-type settlement and the administrative center of Spirovsky District of Tver Oblast, Russia. Population:  It is located on the banks of the Malaya Tigma River.

History
Spirovo was founded in 1847 to serve the railway station at the Moscow – Saint Petersburg Railway. At the time, it belonged to Vyshnevolotsky Uyezd of Tver Governorate. In 1886, a glass-making factory started operation, and in 1908, a railway school was opened.

On July 12, 1929 the governorates and uyezds were abolished. Spirovsky District, with the administrative center in Spirovo, was established within Tver Okrug of Moscow Oblast. On July 23, 1930, the okrugs were abolished, and the districts were directly subordinated to the oblast. On January 29, 1935 Kalinin Oblast was established, and Spirovsky District was transferred to Kalinin Oblast. In February 1963, during the abortive administrative reform by Nikita Khrushchev, Spirovsky District was merged into Vyshnevolotsky District, but on January 12, 1965 it was re-established. During this period, Spirovo was administratively a part of the town of Vyshny Volochyok. In 1990, Kalinin Oblast was renamed Tver Oblast.

Economy

Industry
The glass-making factory was built in Spirovo in 1886 by merchant Kruglov and is still in operation. It is the largest enterprise in the settlement. There are also enterprises of food industry.

Transportation
Spirovo has a railway station on the railway connecting Moscow and St. Petersburg.

It also has access to the M10 highway, which connects Moscow and St. Petersburg. There are local roads as well, with the bus traffic originating from Spirovo.

Culture and recreation
The settlement contains six cultural heritage monuments of local significance. These include monuments to soldiers fallen in World War II as well as two buildings of historical significance.

Spirovo has a local museum.

References

Notes

Sources

Urban-type settlements in Tver Oblast
Vyshnevolotsky Uyezd
Monotowns in Russia